Maxime Teremoana Crocombe (born 12 August 1993) is a New Zealand professional footballer who plays as a goalkeeper for EFL League Two side Grimsby Town and the New Zealand national team.

Crocombe moved to England at an early age and began his professional career with Oxford United who had signed him from Non-League side Buckingham Town. He went on to play on loan with Banbury United, Nuneaton Town, Barnet and Southport before signing permanently with Carlisle United. In 2017 he moved to Salford City where he was part of the City side that won back to back promotions to the Football League. In 2019 he moved to play in the Australian A-League with spells at Brisbane Roar and Melbourne Victory.

Early life
Crocombe was born in Auckland, New Zealand, before moving to England at a young age. He had spells with Milton Keynes Dons and Luton Town before joining Buckingham Town. Crocombe attended Oakgrove School in Milton Keynes along with Crystal Palace player Jeffrey Schlupp.

Club career

Buckingham Town
In the summer of 2009, Crocombe signed for Buckingham Town at the age of 16. He made 33 senior first team appearances before being spotted by scouts of Oxford United. Despite being a goalkeeper he scored one goal in his time at Buckingham Town after coming on as an outfield substitute in a 3–1 league defeat.

Oxford United

Crocombe joined Oxford United as a scholar under youth-team coach Chris Allen and signed his first professional contract in April 2012. He almost made his debut shortly afterwards after injuries to Ryan Clarke and Wayne Brown, and the termination of Connor Ripley's loan, however Oxford eventually signed Arsenal's Emiliano Martínez on loan and Crocombe had to wait for his debut. Whilst at the club, he has been coached by Alan Hodgkinson and Wayne Brown.

Crocombe's Football League debut came in a 1–1 draw with Burton Albion on 29 January 2013. He kept his first clean sheet for the club in his second league appearance, a 1–0 away win over Dagenham & Redbridge in April 2013, which ended a five-match winless run. He remained in goal for the rest of the league season, keeping three consecutive clean sheets with 3–0 wins against both Rochdale and Accrington Stanley. In total, Crocombe made six appearances for club and country in his debut professional season, conceding just one goal. In June 2013, he signed a long-term contract with the club. By the 2013–14 season he had established himself as deputy to Oxford's long-standing number 1, Ryan Clarke.

Crocombe appeared twice in the 2014–15 season, both times in the Football League Cup. In his second appearance he held Premier League side West Bromwich Albion to one goal in 120 minutes and saved their first two spot kicks in the penalty shoot-out. At the end of the season, which included a productive loan spell at Nuneaton Town, the club triggered a 2-year option in his contract to extend his stay until the end of 2017.

Loan to Nuneaton Town
In February 2015, Crocombe signed on loan at Conference Premier side Nuneaton Town until the end of the season. After impressing with a clean sheet on his debut, he was named in the Non-League Paper's Team of the Day. He did not concede a goal in any of his first 6 games and was named man of the match twice in his short spell for the club.

Loan to Barnet
Crocombe was loaned to Barnet on 18 September 2015, with the Bees without a senior keeper due to an injury and a suspension.

Loan to Southport
In October 2015 Crocombe was recalled from Barnet and sent on a three-month loan to Southport of the National League. After a series of impressive performances in his first 3 months for the club he was named Southport's Player of the Month for both November 2015 and January 2016.

Carlisle United
Crocombe left Oxford by mutual consent and signed a one-year deal with Carlisle United on 4 August 2016.

Salford City
In May 2017 he joined Salford City. In October 2017 Crocombe was sent off during a match against Bradford Park Avenue for urinating at the side of a stand  A spectator made a formal complaint and the incident was later reported to the police. Crocombe subsequently posted an apology on Twitter and explained "I was in a very uncomfortable position and made an error of judgement that spoiled a great win".

Brisbane Roar
In July 2019, Crocombe joined Australian A-League side Brisbane Roar to challenge Jamie Young for the starting goalkeeper position. In October 2020, Crocombe left Brisbane Roar.

Melbourne Victory
After leaving Brisbane Roar, Crocombe joined Melbourne Victory in October 2020. He was released on 11 June 2021.

Grimsby Town
On 30 July 2021, Crocombe returned to England, penning a one-year deal with Grimsby Town.

Initially being signed as a back-up keeper, Crocombe became Grimsby's first choice keeper in December at the expense of club veteran James McKeown.

On 23 May 2022, with Grimsby trailing 1-0 to Notts County in the National League play-offs in the final minute of added on time, Crocombe came up for a free kick and with the ball falling to him it bounced off his knees as he prepared to shoot before dropping to Gavan Holohan who scored the equaliser, with Crocombe claiming the assist. Grimsby went on to win the game 2-1 in extra time.

Crocombe played in the 2022 National League play-off Final as Grimsby beat Solihull Moors 2–1 at the London Stadium to return to the Football League.

International career

New Zealand Under-20s

On 22 January 2013, Crocombe was called up to the provisional New Zealand under-20s squad for the 2013 OFC U-20 Championship in Fiji, the regional qualifying tournament for the 2013 FIFA U-20 World Cup. He was confirmed in the final squad of 20 on 20 February 2013 and made his debut in the 1–0 win over Vanuatu. Crocombe kept clean sheets in both his appearances and was voted the best goalkeeper of the tournament, earning him the Golden Glove Award.

He was confirmed in the New Zealand under-20 squad for the 2013 FIFA U-20 World Cup in Turkey and was described as a key player for the team. Crocombe played in two of New Zealand's games as the team exited the competition at the group stage.

New Zealand Under-23s

In June 2015, Crocombe was included in the New Zealand under-23s squad for the Pacific Games, which was used as a qualifying tournament for the 2016 Summer Olympics. Crocombe kept 4 clean sheets in 4 games before New Zealand were disqualified from the tournament for fielding an ineligible player.

Senior Team
In March 2015, Crocombe was called up to the full New Zealand squad for a friendly against South Korea. A year later he was included in the senior squad for the 2016 OFC Nations Cup. He made his full international debut for the All Whites in a friendly against Canada in March 2018.

Career statistics

Honours
Salford City

National League North: 2018
National League play-offs: 2019

Grimsby Town
National League play-off winners: 2022

References

External links
 Oxford United player profile

1993 births
Living people
Association footballers from Auckland
New Zealand association footballers
New Zealand under-20 international footballers
Association football goalkeepers
Milton Keynes Dons F.C. players
Buckingham Town F.C. players
Oxford United F.C. players
Banbury United F.C. players
Nuneaton Borough F.C. players
Barnet F.C. players
Southport F.C. players
Carlisle United F.C. players
Salford City F.C. players
Brisbane Roar FC players
Melbourne Victory FC players
Grimsby Town F.C. players
2016 OFC Nations Cup players
English Football League players
National League (English football) players